Lakan may refer to:

Gilan Province
(لاكان - Lākān)
 Lakan, Gilan
 Lakan Institute, Gilan Province
 Lakan Rural District, in Gilan Province

Markazi Province
(لكان - Lakān)
 Lakan, Markazi